Karachi is a tourist destination for domestic and international tourists. This is a list of tourist attractions in the city of Karachi, Sindh, Pakistan.

Museums

Frere Hall
MagnifiScience Centre
National Museum of Pakistan
Pakistan Air Force Museum
Pakistan Maritime Museum
Quaid-e-Azam House, also known as Flagstaff House, a museum dedicated to the life of Muhammad Ali Jinnah
Wazir Mansion, also as Quaid-i-Azam Birthplace Museum, a museum that was the birthplace of Muhammad Ali Jinnah

Monuments, mosques, and memorials

 Hindu Gymkhana
 Jehangir Kothari Parade
 Grand Jamia Mosque
 Masjid-e-Tooba
 Mazare-e-Quaid Tomb
 Merewether Memorial Tower
 Mohatta Palace
 Monument to Christ the King
 New Memon Masjid
 Teen Talwar
 State Bank of Pakistan Museum & Art Gallery

Historic and other notable buildings

 Abdullah Shah Ghazi Shrine
 Bahria Icon Tower
 Denso Hall
 DJ Science College
 Dolmen City, Clifton
 Sindh Governor House
 Hindu Gymkhana
 Edward House
 Karachi Cantonment railway station
 Khaliq Dina Hall
 Habib Bank Plaza
 Holy Trinity Cathedral
 Jehangir Kothari Parade, Clifton
 Karachi Municipal Corporation Building
 TDF Ghar
 Mohatta Palace
 Mules Mansion
 Saint Patrick's Cathedral, Karachi
 Shri Panchmukhi Hanuman Mandir
 Shri Swaminarayan Mandir, Karachi
 Shri Varun Dev Mandir

Markets and ports

 Empress Market
 Port Trust Building
 M.A. Jinnah Road
 Port Grand
Lucky One Mall
Dolmen Malls
Ocean Mall and Tower

Beaches
 Cape Mount
 Clifton Beach
 French Beach
 Hawke's Bay
 Paradise Point
 Sandspit Beach

Parks

 Aram Bagh
 Aziz Bhatti Park
 Bagh Ibne Qasim, Clifton
 Bagh-e-Jinnah
 Bagh-e-Quaid-e-Azam (popularly known as Polo Ground)
 Boat Basin Park
 Go Aish
 Hasrat Mohani Model Park
 Hill Park
 Jehangir Kothari Parade
 Jheel Park
 Karachi Safari Park
 Karachi Zoo
 Kite Park
 Landhi Korangi Zoo
 Nishtar Park
 Safari Park
 Talimi Bagh
 Zamzama Park

Nearby attractions

 Hingol National Park
 Hub Dam
 Keenjhar Lake
 Makli Necropolis
 Shah Jahan Mosque

Islands 
Baba and Bhit Islands
Buddo Island
Bundal Island
Clifton Oyster Rocks
Khiprianwala Island
Manora
Shams Pir
Churna Island

References

External links 

Pakistan Air Force Museum

Buildings and structures in Karachi
Heritage sites in Karachi
British colonial architecture
 01
tourist attractions
Karachi
Tourist attractions in Sindh
Museums and galleries in Karachi
Auditoriums in Pakistan
Aerospace museums
Air force museums